Little Bit of Life is the fourth studio album by American country music artist Craig Morgan. Released in late 2006 on the independent Broken Bow Records label, the album produced three singles for him on the Billboard Hot Country Songs chart. The title track and lead single from the album reached a peak of No. 7, while "Tough", its follow-up, peaked at No. 11. The third and final single, "International Harvester", reached No. 10. The album was certified Gold in February 2017.

Track listing

Personnel
Eddie Bayers- drums
Jim "Moose" Brown- clavinet, Hammond B-3 organ, keyboards, piano
Shannon Forrest- drums
Larry Franklin- fiddle
Kevin "Swine" Grant- bass guitar
Rob Hajacos- fiddle
Mike Johnson- dobro, steel guitar
Jeff King- electric guitar
Craig Morgan- lead vocals
Norman E. Taylor- background vocals
Phil O'Donnell- electric guitar, background vocals
Paul Scholten- percussion
Bryan Sutton- banjo, acoustic guitar, mandolin
Russell Terrell- background vocals

Chart performance

Weekly charts

Year-end charts

Singles

Certifications

References

2006 albums
BBR Music Group albums
Craig Morgan albums
Albums produced by Keith Stegall